The 2018 Bahrain FIA Formula 2 round was a pair of motor races for Formula 2 cars that took place on 7 and 8 April 2018 at the Bahrain International Circuit in Sakhir, Bahrain as part of the FIA Formula 2 Championship. It was the first round of the 2018 FIA Formula 2 Championship and ran in support of the 2018 Bahrain Grand Prix.

The round saw the competitive début of the new Dallara F2 2018 chassis and its turbocharged Mecachrome engine. The F2 2018 was introduced as a replacement for the aging Dallara GP2/11 chassis and its naturally-aspirated engine, which had been used by the championship and its predecessor, the GP2 Series since 2011.

Report

Background
The race saw the introduction of a brand new chassis to replace the Dallara GP2/11 which had been used since 2011 when the series was known as the GP2 Series. The new car, the Dallara F2 2018, features substantial technical revisions to its design, making it similar to the current Formula One cars. It features the "halo" cockpit protection device for driver head protection and is also powered by a brand new engine, a 3.4 litre (207 cu in) single-turbocharged V6 engine developed by Mecachrome. This was brought in as a replacement for the 4.0 litre (244 cu in) naturally aspirated V8 engine which was used since the GP2 Series began back in 2005.

Driver changes for this season saw reigning champion Charles Leclerc join Formula One with the Alfa Romeo Sauber team, replacing Pascal Wehrlein. Reigning teams' champions Russian Time signed Japanese driver Tadasuke Makino to partner Artem Markelov. Luca Ghiotto, who raced for Russian Time in 2017, joined Campos Racing. DAMS signed Alexander Albon to replace Oliver Rowland, Prema Racing brought in Sean Gelael and Nyck de Vries, and MP Motorsport signed Roberto Merhi and Ralph Boschung, who were also teammates at Campos at the Catalunya round in 2017.

Other débutants this season were Roy Nissany, son of Chanoch Nissany, who joined Campos, Maximilian Günther and Nirei Fukuzumi, who both moved up from the FIA Formula 3 European Championship and GP3 Series respectively with BWT Arden, Arjun Maini, who also graduated from the GP3 Series, joined Trident, partnering Santino Ferrucci. ART Grand Prix promoted Jack Aitken and reigning GP3 Series champion George Russell to their F2 team, and Lando Norris began his first full season with Carlin.

Qualifying
Two Formula 2 full-time rookies Lando Norris and George Russell occupied the front row of the grid. While the second row was locked by more experienced Alexander Albon and Nyck de Vries.

Feature race
After starting from pole Lando Norris dominated the race, finishing ahead of his teammate Sérgio Sette Câmara with almost seven second margin. Sette Câmara defended his runner-up spot on the podium after pressure in the final laps from Russian Time driver Artem Markelov, who was forced to start from pitlane after stalling on the grid. Alexander Albon finished ahead of Russell, who was the highest-placed driver without previous Formula 2 starts. The Prema pairing of Nyck de Vries and Sean Gelael finished behind Russell. Rookie Maximilian Günther finished eighth and subsequently started from pole in the sprint race. Russell's teammate and another rookie driver Jack Aitken finished ninth. Ralph Boschung completed the top-ten. Nicholas Latifi, Luca Ghiotto, Louis Delétraz and Santino Ferrucci were unable to use their experience to score points. Arjun Maini and Roy Nissany finished 15th and 16th on their F2 race debut. Antonio Fuoco finished ahead of the pair of the Japanese rookies Nirei Fukuzumi and Tadasuke Makino, who were the last finished drivers. Like Markelov, Roberto Merhi stalled on the grid, but was unable to start the race from pit lane.

Sprint race
Artem Markelov took his first victory of the season with Maximilian Günther second, Sérgio Sette Câmara rounding out the podium in third and Lando Norris fourth. The final points places went to Nyck de Vries, who also set the fastest lap, Luca Ghiotto, Ralph Boschung, and Nirei Fukuzumi scored his first points with 8th. All drivers finished in this race, with Santino Ferrucci the last finisher in 20th place.

Classification

Qualifying

Feature race

Notes
  – Artem Markelov started from pit lane after stalling on the grid.
  – Roberto Merhi stalled on the grid and was due to start the race from pit lane, but was unable to restart the car.

Sprint race

Championship standings after the round

Drivers' Championship standings

Teams' Championship standings

Notes

References

External links 
 

Bahrain
Sakhir Formula 2
Sakhir Formula 2